Mysore Zoo (Now Mysuru Zoo) (officially the Sri Chamarajendra Zoological Gardens) is a  zoo located near the palace in Mysore, India. It is one of the oldest and most popular zoos in India, and is home to a wide range of species (168). Mysore Zoo is one of the city's most popular attractions.

While mainly depending on entry fees for its financing, an adoption scheme introduced in the early 2000s has been a success. Celebrities, institutions, animal lovers and volunteers of various clubs in the zoo have contributed directly to the welfare of the zoo inhabitants.

History 

Originally called the Palace Zoo, it was renamed "Chamarajendra Zoological Gardens" in 1909. Mr. A.C. Hughes, from South Wales, was the zoo's first superintendent. He served as the superintendent from 1892 to 1924. Hughes, Sir Mirza Ismail, and G.H. Krumbiegel worked towards refashioning the zoo and updating it with modern, natural enclosures.
It now includes a bandstand and an artificial lake. It was given to the Department of Parks and Gardens of the Mysore State Government in 1948. The zoo was expanded first with another , and then another  with the acquisition of the Karanji Tank (Karanji reservoir), in which an artificial island has been created as a sanctuary for birds.

The zoo was handed over to the Forest Department in 1972, and was entrusted to Zoo Authority of Karnataka (the first autonomous organization in India to manage a zoo) in 1979.

The zoo had completed 100 years in 1992. The centenary celebrations were held in 1990 and 91. During the centenary celebrations various developmental activities were initiated such as renovation and modification of the entrance gate, hospital building, Walk Through Reptiles, etc. The bust of Sri Chamarajendra Wadiyar, founder of Mysore Zoo, was unveiled. The logo of the zoo, centenary souvenir, publication of literature & leaflets, conducting various competitions, preparation of a documentary film were other highlights.

Objectives 
The objectives of Mysore Zoo are as under:
 Conservation education
 Conservation breeding
 Research, documentation and study
 Rescue and rehabilitation of the wild animals and birds
 Recreation and education for general visitors, tourist & locals

Animal inventory

Lands under the control of Mysore Zoo 
 Sri Chamarajendra Zoological Gardens, Mysore.
 Karanji Lake Nature Park, Mysore.
 Chamundi Conservation and Rehabilitation Center, Kurugahalli, Mysore.

Peak seasons 

 Summer holidays
 Dasara festival
 New year

Karanji Lake 
The Karanji Lake which covers 77.02 acres is located on the eastern side of the zoo. The Chamundi Hills acts as catchment and provides a dramatic backdrop.

Previously the tank was almost a garbage dump being used by all and sundry for each and every function. There was no bird life but for scavengers, crows, and the entire area was a slum. As such it was in constant danger of being taken over by developers for real estate development. The tank was handed to Mysore Zoo in March 1976 by public works department for development and maintenance. The tank is situated on north-east side of Mysore city. It functions as a percolation tank. After the protection and afforestation in the foreshore area, the tank started attracting a variety of birds for breeding & nesting activities. Restoration and development activities were taken up under the Asian Development Bank project through Karnataka Urban Infrastructure Development Finance Corporation to the extent of Rs.1.17 crores.

About five acres of prime zoo land has been donated to the Natural History Museum, which will enhance the educational potential of the zoo by offering people a rare opportunity to study natural history of wild animals, aquatic birds and tropical vegetation, etc.

Animals 

The zoo is currently home to ten elephants, and has more elephants than any other zoo in India. A total of 34 elephants have lived at this zoo, many of which were eventually transferred to other zoos in Mysore. It is one of the oldest zoos in the world
. The zoo also has five green anacondas, contributed by Colombo Zoo. It is also the only zoo in India to house gorillas, orangutans, white rhinos and cheetahs.

Some of the animals housed in the Mysore Zoo include:

Birds

Mammals

Reptiles

Incidents 

The zoo witnessed a series of animal deaths in 2004 and 2005. In August 2004, a lion-tailed macaque was found mysteriously dead. An emu and a tiger were also reported to have died mysteriously. On 4 September 2004,  an elephant died, reportedly of acute hemorrhagic enteritis and respiratory distress. It was reported that the illness in elephants was due to poisoning. As a safety measure, the zoo authority suspended several staff members who were allegedly responsible for the "gruesome killings". Laboratory tests later confirmed that the two elephants, named Ganesha and Roopa, had been poisoned. This was followed by another elephant death (Komala) on 7 September despite heightened security. Komala had been scheduled to be transferred to Armenia in about a month.

On 24 October 2005 another elephant, Rohan along with his mate Ansul, died with suspicions of poisoning. The elephants were supposed to be sent to Armenia as a goodwill gesture. The Chief Minister of Karnataka immediately ordered a probe into the death of Ansul and Rohan.

4 January 2017, the zoo announced that it was hit by avian influenza. Lab reports confirmed that six free-ranging and migratory birds died due to avian influenza (H5N8) in late December. The monthlong closure is the longest for the 124-year-old Mysore Zoo

Gallery

Notes

External links 

Mysore Zoo Timings | Mysore Zoo Story

Zoos in India
Tourist attractions in Mysore
1892 establishments in India
Zoos established in 1892
Buildings and structures in Mysore
Culture of Mysore